Pyralosis polycyclophora is a species of snout moth in the genus Pyralosis. It was described by George Hampson in 1916. It is found in Malawi, Namibia and South Africa.

References

Moths described in 1916
Pyralini
Lepidoptera of Namibia
Lepidoptera of Malawi
Moths of Sub-Saharan Africa
Lepidoptera of South Africa